Risen is the third album released by O.A.R. Released in 2001, it was the first O.A.R. album to be produced by John Alagia.  The CD debuted on the Billboard Charts Internet Sales: #11 and the Billboard Top New Artists: #66. Several of the tracks are re-recorded songs from previous albums.

Track listing
 "Hey Girl" – 3:50 (originally from Soul's Aflame)
 "Delicate Few" – 5:47
 "Hold on True" – 3:36
 "If Only She Knew" – 3:15
 "Untitled" – 4:35 (originally from Soul's Aflame)
 "She Gone (Only in Dreams)" – 2:44
 "King of the Thing" – 3:57
 "Night Shift" – 3:03 (originally from Soul's Aflame)
 "About Mr. Brown" – 4:49 (originally from The Wanderer)
 "Someone in the Road" - 3:20
 "Here's to You" - 5:48

Personnel
O. A. R.
Chris Culos - drums
Benj Gershman - bass
Richard On - electric guitar
Jerry DePizzo - saxophone
Marc Roberge - vocals, acoustic guitar

Additional Musicians
John Alagia - Hammond, Wurlitzer, background vocals, percussion, guitar
Doug Derryberry - guitar
Johnathan Kaplan - tambourine & shakers

Chart positions

2001 albums
O.A.R. albums
Albums produced by John Alagía